Gia sena (Greek: Για Σένα; English: For You; also known as Gia Sena Sakis Rouvas) is the third studio album by Greek musician Sakis Rouvas, released in October 1993 in Greece and Cyprus by PolyGram Records Greece.

Track listing

Singles
"Kane me"
"Kane me" was the first single from the album. The video was directed by Rouvas' manager Elias Psinakis and his brother Giorgos in collaboration with View Studio. The video is shot half in color and half in black and white; it features Rouvas in militaristic clothing dancing onstage and getting ready to perform.
"To ksero eisai moni"
The second single from the album was "To ksero eisai moni", a romantic ballad. The music video was directed by the Psinakis brothers in collaboration with View Studio and features Rouvas in his home where he is upset when reminiscing about a former lover. He is seen playing with his dalmatian, playing the piano, and writing and destroying letters.
"Ksehase to"
The last single from the album was "Ksehase to". The music video was once again directed by the Psinakis brothers in collaboration with View Studio. It features Rouvas and a model within a photo frame in front of a colorful background. The two continuously appear in different conceptual outfits and have a difficult time getting along with each other.

Release history

Music videos
"Kane me" ("") (Directed by Giorgos and Ilias Psinakis)
"To ksero eisai moni" ("") (Directed by Giorgos and Ilias Psinakis)
"Ksehase to" ("") (Directed by Giorgos and Ilias Psinakis)

References

External links
 Sakis Rouvas' official site

1993 albums
Greek-language albums
Sakis Rouvas albums
Universal Music Greece albums